Khawla bint al-Azwar (died 639), was an Arab Muslim warrior in the service of the Rashidun Caliphate. She played a major role in the Muslim conquest of the Levant, and fought alongside her brother Dhiraar. She has been described as one of the greatest female soldiers in history. She was a companion of the Islamic Prophet Muhammad.

Born sometime in the seventh century as the daughter of Malik or Tareq Bin Awse, one of  the  chiefs of the Banu Assad tribe, Khawlah was well known for her bravery in campaigns of the Muslim conquests in parts of what are today Syria, Jordan, and Palestine. She fought side by side with her brother Dhiraar in many battles, including the decisive Battle of Yarmouk in 636 against the Byzantine Empire. On the 4th day of the battle she led a group of women against the Byzantine army and defeated its chief commander, and later was wounded during her fight with a Greek soldier.

Existence 
The existence of a woman named "Khawla bint al Azwar" has been contested by many due to the lack of evidence in reliable books of history and biographies within Islamic tradition. One of the main sources of her story comes from "Futooh Ash Shaam", which is a book whose attribution to its author is highly debated. The alleged author, Al Waaqidi, is himself an often criticized figure.

Although her brother, Dhiraar, and his brothers have been mentioned within reliable historical sources, there is no mention of a sister. All these factors together engender doubts about her existence.

Military career

Origins and early life 

Khawla was likely born in the 7th-century and her father al-Azwar was a major chief of the Banu Asad tribe. Khawla's brother Dhiraar became a Muslim after the Battle of the Trench. Her family were also one of the early converts to Islam. Dhiraar was a highly skilled warrior and had taught Khawla everything she knew about fighting, from learning the spear, sword fighting, and martial arts.

Conquest of Syria 
Her talent first appeared during the Battle of Sanita-al-Uqab in 634, fought during the Siege of Damascus, in which her brother Dhirar was leading the Muslim forces and was wounded and taken prisoner by the Byzantine army. Khalid ibn Walid took his mobile guard to rescue him. Khawlah accompanied the army and rushed the Byzantine rearguard alone. In her armor and typical loose dress of Arabian warriors she was not recognized as a woman, until she was asked by Khalid about her identity.

In the Battle of Ajnadin, Khawlah accompanied the Muslim forces to provide medical attention to wounded soldiers. After her brother Diraar was captured by the Byzantine forces, Khawlah took a knight's armor, weapons, and mare, wrapping herself in a green shawl. She fought a Byzantine battalion, who were attacking Muslim soldiers. Khalid bin Walid, the leader of the Muslim forces, ordered his soldiers to charge the Byzantines. Many of the Muslim soldiers thought that Khawlah was Khalid until Khalid appeared. The Muslim army defeated the Byzantines, who fled the battlefield. Khalid ordered his army to chase the fleeing Byzantines. After a search, the Muslim prisoners were found and freed.
One of the Rashidun army commanders, Shurahbil ibn Hassana, is reported to have said about her that:
During the Siege of Damascus, Khawla was taken as a war prisoner by the Byzantine forces. However, she managed to escape the place where she was detained.

Other campaigns 
Some traditional sources claim that in another battle, Khawlah was captured after falling from her donkey. After being taken to a camp with other women prisoners, Khawlah was to be taken to the leader's tent as he intended to rape her. Instead, Khawlah roused the other prisoners, who used the tent poles as weapons and attacked the Byzantine guards. According to Al Waqidi, they managed to kill five Byzantine knights with Khawlah taking credit for one, including the Byzantine who insulted her.

Legacy
Khawla's fighting skills were praised by Umar. Many streets and schools in Saudi Arabia, are named after her. Jordan issued a stamp in her honor as part of the "Arab Women in History." Many Arab cities have schools and institutions carrying the name of Khawla Bint al-Azwar.  Today, an Iraqi all-women military unit is named the Khawlah bint al-Azwar unit in Khawlah's honor.  In the United Arab Emirates, the first military college for women, Khawlah bint Al Azwar Training College, is also named for her.

References

Bibliography

Sources
 Islamic Thinkers
 Siddiqi 
 Al Shindagah
 USA Today
"Women in power 500-750" from Guide2womenleaders.com

7th-century Arabs
Women companions of the Prophet
Women in medieval warfare
7th-century women
Women in war in the Middle East
Women soldiers
History of Saudi Arabia
Arab women in war
639 deaths